Sarah Curtis (1676–1743), wife of Benjamin Hoadly, was a British portrait painter.

Life
Sarah Curtis was born in 1676 and before her marriage she gained a reputation as a portrait painter. She was a pupil of Mary Beale, and among her sitters were William Whiston, Gilbert Burnet, and her husband. Her portrait of Burnet was engraved by William Faithorne the Younger. The picture of her husband, which was, 'as is believed, touched up by Hogarth’, is in the National Portrait Gallery.

Curtis married one of her sitters, Benjamin Hoadly, her second husband, at St. James's, Piccadilly, on 30 May 1701. By her the bishop had five children, all sons, two still-born, and Samuel, Benjamin, and John, afterwards the editor of his works. She died in 1743. The bishop's second marriage (23 July 1745) was with Mary, daughter and coheiress of Dr. John Newey, dean of Chichester.

Legacy
Hoadly has several paintings in National collections in the United Kingdom, besides the one in the National Portrait Gallery.

References

External links

1676 births
1743 deaths
18th-century English women artists
18th-century English painters
English women painters
English portrait painters